This is a list of members of the New South Wales Legislative Assembly  who served in the 17th parliament of New South Wales from 1895 to 1898. They were elected at the 1895 colonial election on 24 July 1895. The Speaker was Sir Joseph Abbott.

By-elections

Under the constitution, ministers were required to resign to recontest their seats in a by-election when appointed. These by-elections are only noted when the minister was defeated; in general, he was elected unopposed.

See also
 Reid ministry
 Results of the 1895 New South Wales colonial election
 Candidates of the 1895 New South Wales colonial election

Notes

References

Members of New South Wales parliaments by term
19th-century Australian politicians